The Welsh Youth Parliament (WYP) is a youth model legislature established in 2018 by the Senedd (then the National Assembly for Wales).

It states that its purpose is to empower young people to make decisions and to provide them with a voice in Welsh politics.

Background
The WYP was formed in December 2018 and consists of sixty members of 11 to 18 year olds.

Forty members were elected in an electronic election using the Senedd constituencies and twenty further members were chosen by partner organisations. The young people are known as Members of the Welsh Youth Parliament (WYPMs).

All sixty members of the Parliament meet nationally, over a total of three occasions, during their two-year term. The organisation meets at the Senedd building in Cardiff Bay.

The first meeting of all members took place in February 2019. In addition the members meet in regional meetings to continue their work programme; which are held in the four electoral regions of Wales - Mid & West Wales, North Wales, South-East Wales and South-West Wales. Three regional events are also held over the two-year term where young people from all over Wales can meet with their elected representatives and have their views heard.

Partner organisations 

At its inception, youth organisations across Wales were invited to apply to be partner organisations for the inaugural Parliament. Those who were chosen returned between one and three members each to represent them, coming from a diverse range of people in Wales.

Partner organisations of the Welsh Youth Parliament include:

 Barnardo's Cymru
 Caerphilly Youth Service
 Carers Trust Wales
 Ethnic Minorities & Youth Support Team Wales and Race Council Cymru
 Girlguiding Cymru
 Learning Disability Wales
 National Youth Advocacy Service
 Talking Hands
 Tros Gynnal Plant Cymru
 Urdd Gobaith Cymru
 Voices from Care Cymru
 Youth Cymru
 YMCA Swansea

See also
 Plaid Ifanc
 UK Youth Parliament

References 

Youth empowerment organizations
Politics of Wales
Youth organisations based in Wales
Youth model government
2018 establishments in Wales
Youth organizations established in 2018